"Infected" is the second episode of the American post-apocalyptic drama television series The Last of Us. The episode was written by series co-creator Craig Mazin and directed by co-creator Neil Druckmann, the writer and creative director of the 2013 video game on which the series is based. It aired on HBO on January 22, 2023. In the episode, Joel (Pedro Pascal) and his partner Tess (Anna Torv) escort the young Ellie (Bella Ramsey) through a biological contamination area in Boston to reach the Massachusetts State House.

"Infected" was Druckmann's first experience in directing television; he found it reinforced and reflected his experience in directing video games. The episode introduced "clickers", mutated creatures who rely on sound to move, designed using prosthetics with the game's concept art as reference material. Filming for the episode took place in Calgary and Edmonton, Alberta, in October and November 2021. The episode received positive reviews, with praise for its writing, direction, production design, and performances, particularly Torv's. It was watched by 5.7 million viewers on the first day.

Plot 
In 2003, authorities in Jakarta show Ratna Pertiwi (Christine Hakim), a mycology professor, a sample from a human, which she identifies as Ophiocordyceps. Lieutenant-General Agus Hidayat shows Ratna a corpse of a woman with a human bite mark on its leg and fungal growths in its mouth. He informs Ratna the woman was killed after biting her co-workers at a flour factory, while other co-workers are missing. Ratna remarks the location provides an excellent substrate for the fungus, adds there is no cure or vaccine for the infection, and recommends bombing Jakarta to contain the outbreak.

In 2023, Joel (Pedro Pascal) and Tess (Anna Torv) hold Ellie (Bella Ramsey) at gunpoint and demand to know why they were tasked with escorting her. Ellie reveals the Fireflies have established a secret camp out west with doctors working on a vaccine to prevent infection, and her DNA may be key to ensuring success. Joel demands they return to the quarantine zone but Tess, still skeptical of Ellie's immunity, nonetheless convinces him to follow through with their arrangement as the Fireflies will still give them supplies.

As the group makes its way towards the Massachusetts State House, Tess discovers a pack of infected blocking their route, explaining to Ellie the fungi can sense uninfected humans across long distances and draw its hosts towards them. Tess suggests going through a museum. A roof cave-in attracts two "clickers", mutated hosts who rely on sound to move. Ellie gets bitten and Joel and Tess kill the clickers. Arriving at the State House, they find the Fireflies dead; Joel finds evidence of infection and surmises they killed each other. Tess tries to find clues on where to go next, but Joel tells her the job is finished and they will return home. Tess tells him that she cannot go back, revealing a bite mark on her neck. She reveals Ellie's mark has already healed, proving her immunity.

Joel shoots an infected Firefly who tries to attack them, revealing their location to other infected hosts in the city. Tess tells Joel to take Ellie to fellow smugglers Bill and Frank. She covers the room with gasoline and grenades as Joel and Ellie leave. An infected man begins the process of converting Tess when she ignites the building, killing the creatures. Joel and Ellie watch as the State House explodes before Joel walks away.

Production

Conception and writing 

The Last of Us series creators Craig Mazin and Neil Druckmann respectively wrote and directed "Infected"; Druckmann was the writer and creative director of the video game on which the series is based. The Directors Guild of Canada revealed Druckmann was assigned to direct an episode in September 2021; in February 2022, Druckmann confirmed he directed an episode and said his experience reinforced and reflected his experience in directing games. He previously predicted the experience would be significantly different than directing games, but noted several similarities after witnessing Mazin direct the first episode. He found the biggest difference was the inability to make changes after production; in game development, he is able to request changes to factors such as framing, lighting, clothing, environments and weather. He spent over a month preparing for the episode as it was his first experience in directing television. Pascal considered Druckmann the most open and excited of the show's directors, and Ramsey found his feedback believable due to his proximity to the source material. In January 2023, it was revealed Druckmann directed the second episode. Rotten Tomatoes listed the episode's title in December 2022 as "Cordyceps Ordo Seclorum"; Mazin clarified it was "an early idea" that was later replaced as "it doesn't really make much sense".

An early version of the cold open featured an unseen individual hitting a door, later revealed to be Tess's infected son who she locked in a basement as she was unable to kill him; it was cut before production as the writers felt it did not fit. Torv and the writers thought Tess's decision to keep Ellie safe was to redeem past actions in her life. Mazin ultimately set the cold open in Indonesia to disorient the audience, a technique he was inspired to use from Vince Gilligan's television work. He found episodic storytelling allowed an opportunity to view the origins of the pandemic and demonstrate its global reach. The original plan was to feature a montage of cities around the world, but they lacked the budget. The writers felt following a single character—and her brief connection with one other character—granted a greater sense of dread and grounded the events in reality. The opening scene uses the song "Hampa" by Ari Lasso.

Mazin wanted the clickers to resemble the in-game design through prosthetics; he felt using visual effects would have lessened their impact. Barrie and Sarah Gower, with whom Mazin had worked on Chernobyl, were engaged to create the prosthetics. Their team found themselves continually referring to the original concept art from the game. The performers of the clickers were fans of the game and understood their movement. The silent conversation between Joel and Ellie was added during reshoots as executive producer Carolyn Strauss did not understand how clickers operate. In the game, Tess sacrifices herself to provide Joel and Ellie time to escape pursuing soldiers; in the episode, they are replaced with infected. Mazin considered it illogical for soldiers to patrol so far away from the quarantine zone and felt replacing them with infected granted the opportunity to demonstrate the connectivity between the creatures. Mazin felt the kiss between Tess and the infected underscored the theme of love, noting the creatures were still capable of love through their spread of the fungus. Druckmann wanted to frame and light the shot of the kiss in a beautiful way to emphasize its creepiness.

Joel's final glance at Ellie in the final scene was an unscripted addition by Pascal; Druckmann felt it demonstrated Joel's frustration with Ellie, a feeling she returned. Mazin considered ending the episode with Ellie following Joel but Druckmann insisted the ending remain unresolved. The final scene and credits use the song "Allowed to be Happy" by Gustavo Santaolalla, featured in the video game The Last of Us Part II (2020).

Casting and characters 
Christine Hakim's role was revealed in a trailer in December 2022. She was contacted to appear in the series via Instagram. She was initially hesitant to accept the role as she was caring for her mother and husband amid the COVID-19 pandemic but was convinced by her grandniece, a fan of the game. Hakim recorded her role in Calgary in late October 2021. She brought her traditional batik scarves and Indonesian jewelry, which the costume department accepted for use in the series. Hakim was impressed by Druckmann's ability to direct Indonesian roles and the art director's creation of the Jakarta set in Calgary.

Filming 

Ksenia Sereda worked as cinematographer for the episode. Filming took place in and around Rice Howard Way in Downtown Edmonton from October 2–18, requiring the closure of sidewalks between October 12–14; Pascal filmed establishing shots in the area in early October, and returned for full production later in the month alongside Ramsey and Torv. The location replicated a post-apocalyptic Boston; production designer John Paino was unable to find a location imitating Boston's brick-lined streets, requiring manual transformation and sculpting on set. Manual tree placement was similarly required as Canadian trees share few similarities with those in Boston. Rice Howard Way was set up with a large crater in front of an Italian restaurant and a green screen for the skyline. The production crew converted a local business into a ruined salon and asked another if they would permit a stunt performer to fly through the front window.

Production took place at the Alberta Legislature Building, which was dressed with vines and greenery. Some streets in downtown Calgary were closed for production from October 15–18, followed by the closure of several blocks in Beltline from October 23–28. Shutting down the Fourth Avenue flyover that took the locations team around six to eight weeks of negotiations with the city. The hotel interior location required draining as fungi quickly began to grow. Paino designed the Indonesian lab with "big and sinister" air ducts; he kept the colors simple to maintain realism and avoid resembling science fiction. Druckmann's work on the episode completed production by November 7, 2021.

Reception

Broadcast and ratings 
The episode aired on HBO on January 22, 2023. The episode had 5.7 million viewers in the United States on its first night, including linear viewers and streams on HBO Max—an increase of 22 percent from the previous week, the largest second-week audience growth for an original HBO drama series in the network's history. On linear television, it had 633,000 viewers on its first night, with a 0.18 ratings share.

Critical response 

On review aggregator Rotten Tomatoes, "Infected" has an approval rating of 97 percent based on 33 reviews, with an average rating of 8.7/10. The website's critical consensus said the episode features "a terrific turn by Anna Torv and monsters that fully deliver on their terrifying potential". TVLine named Torv the Performer of the Week, citing her complexity and subtlety. Total Films Bradley Russell felt she demonstrated Tess's emotional depth, and Den of Geeks Bernard Boo found her performance sophisticated and heartbreaking. IGNs Simon Cardy wrote she displayed "warmth beneath a scarred, steely surface", lauding her relationship with Pascal's Joel. IndieWires Steve Greene applauded Torv's capability to demonstrate Tess's sadness and pain through facial expressions alone. Praise was also directed at Pascal's performance for his restraint and Ramsey for her humor, and Den of Geeks Boo commended all three cast members for acting "with intention", allowing viewers to witness their emotional foundations. Push Squares Aaron Bayne felt Ramsey had not yet "embodied the role" of Ellie like Pascal with Joel but enjoyed their banter.

Total Films Russell lauded Mazin's writing and found quiet moments and conversations carried purpose and dramatic weight. The Escapists Darren Mooney felt the script occasionally felt "like reading a strategy guide" due to the amount of exposition delivered through dialogue, noting it was effective but not compelling. The cold open was generally well-received; The Washington Posts Mikhail Klimentov found it more effective than the previous episode's due to its delivery of melancholy and dread without the restraint of providing context, though Den of Geeks Boo considered it "less compelling" than the entirety of the first episode. IGNs Cardy wrote the kiss between Tess and the infected validated the creative decision to replace spores with tendrils. Conversely, Total Films Russell considered it "a baffling choice and fundamentally silly", and The Washington Posts Klimentov found it the worst sequence of the series to date. Several outlets similarly reported viewers were similarly divided on the scene; some called it heartbreaking and others considered it unnecessary.

Several critics praised Druckmann's directing and Sereda's cinematography, particularly during the museum action sequence; Den of Geeks Boo called it "masterfully choreographed" and compared it to the video game, and IGNs Cardy found it fit the inelegant aesthetic of the world. Total Films Russell praised Druckmann's "keen eye for beauty in this shattered world", citing a shot of a frog on a piano as a standout. The New York Timess Noel Murray felt the low-angle shots allowed an effective backdrop for visual effects. Reviewers lauded the production design; IGNs Cardy considered it "one of the show's high points" with its visualization of nature reclaiming civilization. Den of Geeks Boo found the design and sounds of the clickers appropriately frightening; The Hollywood Reporters Daniel Fienberg called them "a genre palate cleanser" after The Walking Deads design.

References

External links

2023 American television episodes
Murder–suicide in television
Television episodes about sacrifices
Television episodes directed by Neil Druckmann
Television episodes set in Boston
Television episodes set in Indonesia
Television episodes written by Craig Mazin
The Last of Us (TV series) episodes